Below are the results for the 2012 World Series of Poker Europe.

Key

Results

Event 1: €2,700 Six Handed No Limit Hold'em
3-Day Event: September 21–23
Number of buy-ins: 227
Total Prize Pool: €544,800
Number of Payouts: 24
Winning Hand:

Event 2: €1,100 No Limit Hold'em
4-Day Event: September 22–25
Number of buy-ins: 626
Total Prize Pool: €600,960
Number of Payouts: 63
Winning Hand:

Event 3: €5,300 Pot Limit Omaha
3-Day Event: September 24–26
Number of buy-ins: 97
Total Prize Pool: €475,300
Number of Payouts: 12
Winning Hand:

Event 4: €3,250 No Limit Hold'em Shootout
3-Day Event: September 25–27
Number of buy-ins: 141
Total Prize Pool: €406,080
Number of Payouts: 20
Winning Hand:

Event 5: €10,450 Mixed Max No Limit Hold'em
4-Day Event: September 26–29
Number of buy-ins: 96
Total Prize Pool: €921,600
Number of Payouts: 16
Winning Hand:

Event 6: €1,650 Six Handed Pot Limit Omaha
3-Day Event: September 27–29
Number of buy-ins: 206
Total Prize Pool: €302,820
Number of Payouts: 21
Winning Hand:

Event 7: €10,450 No Limit Hold'em Main Event
6-Day Event: September 29-October 4
Number of buy-ins: 420
Total Prize Pool: €4,032,000
Number of Payouts: 48
Winning Hand:

Notes

World Series of Poker Europe
World Series of Poker Europe Results, 2012